The Adventures of Ook and Gluk: Kung-Fu Cavemen from the Future is a graphic novel by Dav Pilkey, the second spin-off of the Captain Underpants series. The book is credited to Captain Underpants characters "George Beard" as the author and "Harold Hutchins" as the illustrator.

The plot of the book involves George and Harold, the lead characters from Pilkey's Captain Underpants series, complaining that scientists do not know everything, so they make a comic book about science facts.

In March 2021, the author and publisher announced that the book was being removed from the market for perpetuating harmful stereotypes.

Plot

Introduction 
The book begins with a scientific disclaimer by professor Gaylord M. Sneedly, saying that the book "contains many scientific errors and stuff." He stated that dinosaurs and cavemen did not live at the same time, as dinosaurs lived 64 million years before cavemen. He then stated that he should know about it, since he was a recipient of "The Most Brilliantest Science Guy of the Whole Wide World Award" in 2003, a reference to the seventh Captain Underpants book.

However, George and Harold refute this via a "scientific disclaimer disclaimer". They said that scientists make theories based on evidence they discovered, and that every day, all kinds of new evidence are being discovered. They also mentioned that they have a time machine, and have been time traveling to the future and past, discovering much evidence that scientists had no knowledge of, including dinosaurs and cavemen living at the same time. George and Harold stated that "scientists won't discover that until 2073." So they made "the world's first book based on science facts".

Main plot 
The real story begins in Cave-land Ohio, 500,001 BC, the tribal leader of Cave-land, Big Chief Goppernopper, forces Gak, the older sister of Ook, to marry him in order to keep Ook and Gluk from bothering him. After saving her from a sandpit, the two Cave-kids befriend one of the dinosaur species Mog-Mog and her baby, and stop the wedding. Angered, Goppernopper walks away until he meets his descendant, J.P, who is the CEO from 2222 A.D. The Goppernoppers steals natural resources from caveman days through a time portal, since natural resources will be used up by that year. Ex-Chief goes back to the past and forces every cave-person in Cave-land to belong to the Goppernopper Enterprises. The Cave-kids and the baby Mog-Mog are shoveling until the Goppernoppers take them to 2222 to torture them, but the baby helps them escape and the three hide in Master Wong's School of Kung-Fu.

Ook and Gluk grow up, training under Master Wong for 7 years, but the cave-kids have to give the right answer: "Who is the greatest man?" When it's time to save their people, they finally answer: nobody. Wong finally awards them black belts. They and their dinosaur friend Lily travel back to caveman days (in 500,008 BC) and free the slaves. Goppernopper returns and orders his Mecha-saurs to attack the cave kids and dinosaur, but they spray-paint on the Enterprises building, then an explosive tank, which also destroys the Mecha-saurs themselves. Goppernopper sends them a letter, that Wong and Lan will be executed if the kids won't surrender. Back to 2229, Ook and Gluk plead with the Goppernoppers that they will do anything to satisfy them and they handcuff the three, but vows to execute them all. Wong tells them to remember their training, then, when J.P prepares his ray, the Cave-kids ask: Who is the greatest man? J.P and Chief answer themselves and their argument eventually makes J.P. shoot and kill Chief, which accidentally erases himself and his damage on the world from history. The Cave-kids and Lily run back to the disappearing portal, but Ook soon returns for Lan, who agrees to be his cave wife and they warp back together, while 2229 receives a brighter and peaceful future. Lily finally reunites with her mother, while the Cave-kids, Lan and the dinosaurs return happily to Cave-land.

Caveman Speak

The final chapter teaches the comic readers how to speak in caveman language. Many examples are given to translate normal English to caveman speak. The book also includes a 12-part “How-2-Draw” series depicting how to draw characters like Gluk in 32 easy steps.

Characters
 Ook Schadowski – a Caveman who is best friends with Gluk. He later marries Lan, but is (twice) in the book losing his tooth.
 Gluk Jones – a Caveman who is the best friend of Ook, he later on married Ook's sister Gak, he has had an afro ever since birth.
 Gak Schadowski – Ook's sister who later becomes Gluk's wife.
 Master Derrick Wong – Ook and Gluk's kung-fu teacher from the 23rd century, who taught the two heroes kung-fu for many years. He is the father of Lan. It is unknown about his wife, so it is assumed he is either a widower or is divorced.
 Lan Wong – Master Wong's daughter, who later becomes Ook's wife and moves to Caveland to have her marriage, leaving her father.
 Mog-Mog – a tyrannosaurus rex who hated Ook and Gluk when they were kids, but became friends after Ook and Gluk saved her life.
 Lily Mog – Mog-Mog's dinosaur daughter. Lan named her Lily after her favorite flower; she always vomited when spinning in circles. After she was far away from Mog-Mog after Chief Goppernopper's destruction, Ook and Gluk had to look after Lily.
 Big Chief Goppernopper – The dictator of Caveland and one of the two main antagonists.
 Big Chief Goppernopper's Guards
 J.P. Goppernopper – The Chief Executive Officer of Goppernopper Enterprises and the descendant of Chief Goppernopper. He is one of the two main antagonists. A play on John D. Rockefeller, the famous oil tycoon.
 J.P. Goppernopper's Workers
 The Mechasaurs – They are a robotic T-Rex, Triceratops and Pterodactyl. They are Big Chief Goppernopper's robot dinosaurs who attempt to attack Ook and Gluk.
 Gluk Jones Jr. – The son of Gluk and Gak Jones.
 Ook Schadowski Jr. – The son of Ook and Lan Schadowski.
 George Beard – Author of Captain Underpants. (Only appeared in the About the Author and Illustrator page).
 Harold Hutchins – Illustrator of Captain Underpants, Super Diaper Baby, The Amazing Cow Lady and Hairy Potty. (Only appeared in the About the Author and Illustrator page).
 Professor Gaylord Sneedly - The scientist and father of Melvin Sneedly, George and Harold's nemesis.

Reception
The book was at #2 on the New York Times hardcover graphic novel best-sellers list its first week of release, and remained at first place for six consecutive weeks. It served 33 weeks on the list, its period on the list overlapping with the paperback edition's presence on the paperback best sellers list.

School Library Journal described the book's humor as "completely immature, and for the target audience, completely hilarious". Booklist suggested that the book would "appeal to those who like silly adventures, puke-based humor, and kung-fu fighting."

Removal from market 
On March 25, 2021, Dav Pilkey announced on his YouTube channel stating that he and Scholastic have removed the book from print due to some stereotyping harmful to Asians.

According to the video, all money that Pilkey and his wife have made from the book will be donated to "charities that provide free books, art supplies, and theater for children in underserved communities; organizations that promote diversity in children’s books and publishing; and organizations designed to stop Asian hatred."

References

2010 American novels
2010 graphic novels
Comics set in prehistory
Comics set in the 23rd century
Comics about time travel
Comics spin-offs
Captain Underpants novels
American children's novels
Works by Dav Pilkey
Novels about race and ethnicity
Martial arts comics
Prehistoric people in popular culture
2010 children's books
Race-related controversies in literature
Race-related controversies in comics
Blue Sky Press books